Karl Schröder (1912–1996) was a German cinematographer. During the 1930s he worked on Kulturfilms for UFA. In the 1950s he began working on feature films, many of them shot at the Göttingen Studios. He was also employed for television production.

Selected filmography
 She (1954)
 Mamitschka (1955)
 Roman einer Siebzehnjährigen (1955)
 In Hamburg When the Nights Are Long (1956)
 Like Once Lili Marleen (1956)
 The Hunter from Roteck (1956)
 Lockvogel der Nacht (1959)
 Two Times Adam, One Time Eve (1959)
 Hunting Party (1959)
 Doctor Sibelius (1962)
 Zwei Whisky und ein Sofa (1963)
 A Man in His Prime (1964)
 Kurzer Prozeß (1967)

References

Bibliography
 Cowie, Peter & Elley, Derek. World Filmography: 1967. Fairleigh Dickinson University Press, 1977.

External links

1912 births
1996 deaths
German cinematographers
People from Sächsische Schweiz-Osterzgebirge